Severino Franco da Silva (17 June 1898 – 5 March 1972), known as Lagarto, was a Brazilian footballer. He played in four matches for the Brazil national football team in 1925. He was also part of Brazil's squad for the 1925 South American Championship.

References

External links
 

1898 births
1972 deaths
Brazilian footballers
Brazil international footballers
Place of birth missing
Association footballers not categorized by position